José Maria Antunes (27 July 1913 – 12 March 1991) was a Portuguese football player and manager who had three spells as manager of the Portugal national team.

References

External links 

1913 births
1991 deaths
Portuguese footballers
Association football defenders
Primeira Liga players
Associação Académica de Coimbra – O.A.F. players
Portuguese football managers
Portugal national football team managers
Year of death missing